An ostium (plural ostia) in anatomy is a small opening or orifice.

Ostium or ostia may refer to:

Human anatomy
 Ostium of fallopian tube
 Ostium of the uterus (disambiguation)
 Ostium primum of the developing heart
 Ostium secundum (foramen ovale) of the developing heart
 Ostium maxillare of the maxillary sinus
 Ostium vaginae (vaginal orifice)
 Coronary ostium – opening of coronary arteries at root of aorta, superior to aortic valve
 Sinus ostium an opening that connects a sinus to the nasal cavity itself.

In other animals
Ostium (sponges), the pores of living sponges
Ostia of female lepidoptera genitalia

See also
 
Pore (disambiguation)
Foramen
Ostiole